The Badge is a 2002 mystery-thriller film directed by Robby Henson and starring Billy Bob Thornton, Patricia Arquette and William Devane.

Release 
The Badge was originally intended to be distributed by Propaganda Films, but the production company went bankrupt during the film's post-production. It was later released on DVD by Lionsgate Films.

Synopsis
La Salle Parish, Louisiana sheriff Darl Hardwick investigates the controversial local murder of a transsexual woman, with the highly sensitive matter being concealed as much as possible by the parish's most influential figures, such figures even going so far as to frame Hardwick for statutory rape involving a local waitress. With his career as sheriff at an end, Hardwick takes a personal stake in the investigation after becoming acquainted with Scarlett, the victim's widow. Hardwick heads down a somewhat reckless path to an understanding of the victim's world, reconciliation for past sins, and a series of dark truths within the parish itself.

Reception 
The Badge holds a 33% rating on review aggregation website Rotten Tomatoes, based on six reviews.

Cast

Filming locations
 Baton Rouge, Louisiana
 Donaldsonville, Louisiana
 Iberville Parish, Louisiana
 Pointe Coupee Parish, Louisiana
 New Orleans, Louisiana
 Jarreau, Louisiana

External links

References 

2002 films
2002 crime drama films
2002 crime thriller films
2002 LGBT-related films
2000s mystery thriller films
American crime drama films
American crime thriller films
American LGBT-related films
American mystery thriller films
Films directed by Robby Henson
Films shot in France
Films shot in Louisiana
Films shot in New Orleans
Transgender-related films
MoviePass Films films
Gold Circle Films films
2002 drama films
Homophobia in fiction
Films about violence against LGBT people
2000s English-language films
2000s American films